Silver Creek is a stream, about  long, in Marion County, Oregon, United States. It is a tributary of the Pudding River and originates in Silver Falls State Park in the Cascade foothills above the cities Silverton and Stayton.

Course

Silver Creek originates in the northwestern part of Silver Falls State Park at the confluence of its North and South Forks. It runs for another  to its confluence with the Pudding River.

See also 
 List of rivers of Oregon
 Oregon Garden, which was designed, in part, to divert Silverton's sewage effluent from the creek.

References

External links
 Pudding River Watershed Council
 Marion Soil and Water Conservation District

Rivers of Oregon
Rivers of Marion County, Oregon